= Malla, Shimoga =

Malla
- village
- Country: India
- State: Karnataka
- District: Shimoga
- Talukas: Sagar

Government
  - Body: Village Panchayat

Languages
  - Official: Kannada
- Time zone: UTC+5:30 (IST)
- Civic agency: Village Panchayat

Malla is a village located in the Shimoga District of Karnataka, India.

== Administration ==
Malla village is administrated by Sarpanch (Head of Village), who is elected representative of the village, according to Indian Panchayti Raj Act.

== Literacy ==
According to the 2011 Indian Census, the literacy rate of Malla is 71.6%. The village has lower literacy rate compared to 72.1% of Shimoga district. The male literacy rate is 82.27 percent and the female literacy rate is 61.36 percent in Malla village.
